

2022

See also
 List of wealthiest families

References

Lists of people by wealth
Net worth
Economy of Asia-related lists